TUF may refer to:

Transformer utilization factor
Transcript of unknown function
The Ultimate Fighter, a reality television series
The Update Framework, a secure software update framework
Tours Loire Valley Airport, Tours, France (IATA airport code: TUF)
The Unforgettable Fire, an album by Irish rock band U2
"The Unforgettable Fire" (song), a song from the album above
"The Ultimate Fling", a song by Finnish rock band Poets of the Fall
The United Force, a Guyanese political party
Time-utility function, a mean for real time computing
ASUS TUF (The Ultimate Force), an ASUS brand for affordable, mid-range and low-end gaming products.
The Unifying Force, a Star Wars novel written by James Luceno
The University of Faisalabad, a private university in Pakistan
TV-U Fukushima, a commercial broadcaster in Japan

See also
Tuf Borland (born 1998), American football player
Tuf Voyaging, a 1986 science fiction novel by George R. R. Martin
Tuff, a type of rock consisting of consolidated volcanic ash
Tuff (disambiguation)
Tough (disambiguation)

pt:TUF